Curtimorda is a genus of beetles in the family Mordellidae, containing the following species:

 Curtimorda bisignata (Redtenbacher, 1849)
 Curtimorda maculosa (Neazen, 1794)

References

Mordellidae